Jagirdar (Landlord) is a 1937 Hindi romantic melodrama film directed by Mehboob Khan, and starring Bibbo, Motilal, Surendra, Yakub, Pande, Sankatha Prasad, Pesi Patel and Maya Banerjee.

The film was produced by Sagar Movietone and was Anil Biswas' first major venture as an independent music director. After the success of Manmohan, Anil Biswas replaced Ashok Ghosh as an acclaimed composer continuously producing a range of successful music. The story was written by Babubhai Mehta with dialogues credited to Zia Sarhadi. The lyricists were Zia Sarhadi and Pandit Indra Sharma.

Plot
Neela (Bibbo) and Jagirdar (Surendra) marry each other without anyone's knowledge. However, Jagirdar goes missing at sea presumed dead. Neela realises she's pregnant and when the child is born he's called illegitimate. Shripat (Pande), a poor farmer marries her and helps take care of her son Ramesh. On his return Jagirdar is angry to find Neela married to Shripat and a fight ensues. When Shripat is killed by Banwarilal everyone assumes Jagirdar is the murderer. Soon with Ramesh's help they fight the villains with the truth revealed. Ramesh finally accepts Jagirdar as his father.

Cast
Bibbo as Neela
Surendra as Jagirdar
Motilal as Ramesh
Yakub as Narayanlal
Pande as Shripat
Zia Sarhadi
Bhudo Advani
Maya Banerjee
Sankatha Prasad
Ram Marathe

Production
The film had a strong Hollywood influence and the murder mystery was reminiscent of Hitchcock films. The film starred Motilal as the newcomer Surendra's son. Motilal's "casual style of acting" was appreciated by critics. The directors of photography were Keki Mistry and Faredoon Irani.

Songs

References

External links

1937 films
1930s Hindi-language films
Films directed by Mehboob Khan
Indian romantic drama films
1937 romantic drama films
Indian black-and-white films
Melodrama films